TramwayPath is a website that organizes property prize competitions. The website was established in 2020 by Daniel Twenefour, and held its first competition in May 2020.

History 
Twenefour started TramwayPath in May 2020 as a means to sell his property which was located in Tramway Path in Mitcham, South London through a legally binding prize competition for £2 a ticket, after trying to sell the property for around one year. Prize competitions held by TramwayPath include a no purchase necessary clause to avoid being classed as a lottery.
After successfully giving away his property, Twenefour continued to run the prize competitions alongside his brothers, William and Jason Twenefour.

See also 
 Omaze

References 

Internet properties established in 2020
British websites
2020 establishments in the United Kingdom